Elapidae (commonly known as elapids ;  éllops "sea-fish") is a family of snakes characterized by their permanently erect fangs at the front of the mouth. Most elapids are venomous, with the exception of the genus Emydocephalus. Many members of this family exhibit a threat display of rearing upwards while spreading out a neck flap. Elapids are endemic to tropical and subtropical regions around the world, with terrestrial forms in Asia, Australia, Africa, and the Americas and marine forms in the Pacific and Indian Oceans. Members of the family have a wide range of sizes, from the  white-lipped snake to the  king cobra. Most species have neurotoxic venom which is channeled by their hollow fangs, and some may contain other toxic components in various proportions. The family includes 55 genera with some 360 species and over 170 subspecies.

Description
Terrestrial elapids look similar to the Colubridae; almost all have long, slender bodies with smooth scales, a head covered with large shields and not always distinct from the neck, and eyes with round pupils. In addition, their behavior is usually quite active, and most are oviparous. Exceptions to all these generalizations occur: e.g. the death adders (Acanthophis) which have similarities to the vipers: short and fat bodies, rough-scaled, very broad-headed, cat-eyed, live-bearing, sluggish ambush predators with partly fragmented head shields.

Sea snakes (the Hydrophiinae), sometimes considered to be a separate family, have adapted to a marine way of life in different ways and to various degrees. All have evolved paddle-like tails for swimming and the ability to excrete salt. Most also have laterally compressed bodies, their ventral scales are much reduced in size, their nostrils are located dorsally (no internasal scales), and they give birth to live young (viviparity). The reduction in ventral scaling has greatly diminished their terrestrial mobility, but aids in swimming.

Members of this family have a wide range of sizes. Cobras, mambas, and taipans are mid- to large sized snakes which can reach  or above.

Dentition

All elapids have a pair of proteroglyphous fangs to inject venom from glands located towards the rear of the upper jaw (except for the genus Emydocephalus, in which fangs are present as a vestigial feature but without venom production, as they have specialized toward a fish egg diet). The fangs, which are enlarged and hollow, are the first two teeth on each maxillary bone. Usually only one fang is in place on each side at any time. The maxilla is intermediate in both length and mobility between typical colubrids (long, less mobile) and viperids (very short, highly mobile). When the mouth is closed, the fangs fit into grooved slots in the buccal floor and usually below the front edge of the eye and are angled backwards; some elapids (Acanthophis, taipan, mamba, and king cobra) have long fangs on quite mobile maxillae and can make fast strikes. A few species are capable of spraying their venom from forward-facing holes in their fangs for defense, as exemplified by spitting cobras.

Behavior
Most elapids are terrestrial, while some are strongly arboreal (African Pseudohaje and Dendroaspis, Australian Hoplocephalus). Many species are more or less specialized burrowers (e.g. Ogmodon, Parapistocalamus, Simoselaps, Toxicocalamus, and Vermicella) in either humid or arid environments. Some species have very generalised diets (euryphagy), but many taxa have narrow prey preferences (stenophagy) and correlated morphological specializations, for example feeding almost exclusively on other serpents (especially the king cobra and kraits). Elapids may display a series of warning signs if provoked, either obviously or subtly. Cobras and mambas lift their inferior body parts, expand hoods, and hiss if threatened; kraits often curl up before hiding their heads down their bodies.

In general, sea snakes are able to respire through their skin. Experiments with the yellow-bellied sea snake, Hydrophis platurus, have shown that this species can satisfy about 20 % of its oxygen requirements in this manner, allowing for prolonged dives. The sea kraits (Laticauda spp.) are the sea snakes least adapted to aquatic life. Their bodies are less compressed laterally, and they have thicker bodies and ventral scaling. Because of this, they are capable of some land movement. They spend much of their time on land, where they lay their eggs and digest prey.

Distribution
Terrestrial elapids are found worldwide in tropical and subtropical regions, mostly in the Southern Hemisphere. Most prefer humid tropical environments, and so are not found in the Sahara or Middle East, although some can be found in Mexican and Australian deserts. Sea snakes occur mainly in the Indian Ocean and the south-west Pacific. They occupy coastal waters and shallows, and are common in coral reefs. However, the range of Hydrophis platurus extends across the Pacific to the coasts of Central and South America.

Venom
Venoms of species in the Elapidae are mainly neurotoxic for immobilizing prey and defense. The main group of toxins are PLA2 and Three-finger toxins (3FTx). Other toxic components in some species comprise cardiotoxins and cytotoxins, which cause heart dysfunctions and cellular damage, respectively. Cobra venom also contains hemotoxins which clot or solidify blood. All members are venomous to varying extents, and some are considered among the world's most venomous snakes based upon their murine  values, such as the taipans. Large species, mambas and cobras included, are dangerous for their capability of injecting high quantities of venom upon single envenomation and/or striking at a high position proximal to the victim's brain, which is vulnerable to neurotoxicity. Antivenom is promptly required to be administrated if bitten by any elapids. Specific antivenoms are the only cure to treat elapidae bites. There are commercial monovalent and polyvalent antivenoms for cobras, mambas, and some other important elapids. Recently, experimental antivenoms based on recombinant toxins have shown that it is feasible to create antivenoms with a wide spectrum of coverage.

Venom of spitting cobras is more cytotoxic rather than neurotoxic. It damages local cells, especially those in eyes, which are deliberately targeted by the snakes. The venom may cause intense pain on contact with the eye and may lead to blindness. It is not lethal on skin if no wound provides any chance for the toxins to enter the bloodstream.

Taxonomy
The table below lists out all of the elapid genera and no subfamilies. In the past, many subfamilies were recognized, or have been suggested for the Elapidae, including the Elapinae, Hydrophiinae (sea snakes), Micrurinae (coral snakes), Acanthophiinae (Australian elapids), and the Laticaudinae (sea kraits). Currently, none are universally recognized. Molecular evidence via techniques like karyotyping, protein electrophoretic analyses, immunological distance and DNA sequencing, suggests reciprocal monophyly of two groups: African, Asian, and New World Elapinae versus Australasian and marine Hydrophiinae. The Australian terrestrial elapids are technically 'hydrophiines', although they are not sea snakes. It is believed that the Laticauda and the 'true sea snakes' evolved separately from Australasian land snakes. Asian cobras, coral snakes, and American coral snakes also appear to be monophyletic, while African cobras do not.

The type genus for the Elapidae was originally Elaps, but the group was moved to another family. In contrast to what is typical of botany, the family Elapidae was not renamed. In the meantime, Elaps was renamed Homoroselaps and moved back to the Elapidae. However, Nagy et al. (2005) regard it as a sister taxon to Atractaspis, which should have been assigned to the Atractaspidinae.

* Not including the nominate subspecies

Conservation
With the dangers the taxa presents given their venomous nature it is very difficult for activists and conservationists alike to get species on protection lists such as the IUCN red-list and CITES Apenndix lists. Some of the protected species are:

 Vulnerable:
 Ophiophagus hannah (King cobra)
 Austrelaps labialis (Pygmy copperhead)
 Denisonia maculate (Ornamental snake)
 Echiopsis atriceps (Lake Cronin snake)
 E. curta (Bardick)
 Furina dunmalli (Dunmall's snake)
 Hoplocephalus bungaroides (Broad-headed snake)
 Ogmodon vitianus (Fiji snake)
 Lower Risk/Near threatened:
 Elapognathus minor (Short-nosed snake)
 Simoselaps calonotus (Black-striped snake)

This however doesn't touch the number of elapidae that are under threat, for instance 9 % of elapid sea snakes are threatened with another 6 % near-threatened. A rather large road block that stands in the way of more species being put under protection is lack of knowledge of the taxa; many known species have little research done on their behaviors or actual population as they live in very remote areas or live in habitats that are so vast its nearly impossible to conduct population studies, like the sea snakes.

See also 
List of snake genera, overview of all snake families and genera

Explanatory notes

References

Further reading

External links 

 
Venomous snakes
Snake families
Taxa named by Friedrich Boie
Endemic fauna of Saudi Arabia